Cantonius is a genus of beetles in the family Buprestidae, containing the following species:

 Cantonius bolmi Kalashian, 2004
 Cantonius fokienicus Kalashian, 2004
 Cantonius jendeki Kalashian, 2004
 Cantonius klapperichi Obenberger, 1940
 Cantonius khnzoriani Kalashian, 2004
 Cantonius megacephalus Kalashian, 2004
 Cantonius nitidifrons Kalashian, 2004
 Cantonius obenbergeri (Gebhardt, 1928)
 Cantonius obesus Obenberger, 1940
 Cantonius szechuanensis Obenberger, 1958
 Cantonius terryi Thery, 1929

References

Buprestidae genera